John Chester is a filmmaker.

John Chester may also refer to:

John Chester (Connecticut soldier) (1749–1809), militia officer and public official 
John Chester (rower) (born 1935), British Olympic rower
John Chester (university president) (1785–1829), president of Rensselaer Polytechnic Institute
John Willie Chester, professional rugby league footballer who played in the 1900s and 1910s
John Chester of the Chester baronets
Johnny Chester (born 1941), Australian rock'n'roll pioneer and country music artist

See also

Chester (disambiguation)